Oldfather is a surname.

People with this surname include:

 William Abbott Oldfather (1880–1945), American classical scholar
 Charles Henry Oldfather (1887–1954), American professor of history of the ancient world
 Irene Oldfather (born 1954), former Scottish Labour Party politician, Member of the Scottish Parliament (MSP) for Cunninghame South 1999–2011
 Dana Oldfather (born 1978), American oil painter and dinnerware designer 

English-language surnames